Gary Cleveland (January 18, 1942 – January 4, 2004) was an American weightlifter. He competed in the men's light heavyweight event at the 1964 Summer Olympics.

References

External links
 
 Obituary  in Minneapolis Star Tribune

1942 births
2004 deaths
American male weightlifters
Olympic weightlifters of the United States
Weightlifters at the 1964 Summer Olympics
People from Hastings, Nebraska
Sportspeople from Nebraska
20th-century American people
21st-century American people